Backfire  is a 1964 French crime film directed by Jean Becker, which stars Jean-Paul Belmondo and Jean Seberg, reuniting for the first time since Breathless (1960).

Plot
A criminal organisation offers a Parisian man, David, $10,000 to transport a car across Europe. They tell him little about it except that drugs are not involved. He is accompanied by a photographer, Olga.

David discovers he is smuggling gold. The two travel to Beirut then Damascus. They fall in love and David wants the gold for himself.

Cast
 Jean-Paul Belmondo as David Ladislas 
 Jean Seberg as Olga Celan 
 Enrico Maria Salerno as Mario 
 Gert Fröbe as Fehrman
 Renate Ewert as Comtesse 
 Jean-Pierre Marielle as Van Houde 
 Diana Lorys as Rosetta
 Fernando Rey as the Lebanese policeman
 Wolfgang Preiss as Grenner 
 Michel Beaune as Daniel 
 Roberto Camardiel as Stephanidès 
 Fernando Sancho as Ylmaz
 Giacomo Furia as Nino

Production
The film was made by the same team who had produced Banana Peel (1963).

It was to have starred Jean Louis Trintignant but he withdrew and was replaced by Belmondo.

Filming took place from February 10 to April 7, 1964. Costa-Gavras was an assistant director.

Reception
The film was the 19th most popular movie at the French box office in 1964.

In 2020 Fimink wrote "The film’s existence is ideal useless trivia to annoy people with now that the Jean Seberg biopic has come out."

References

External links
 
 
 
 Backfire at Le Film Guide
 Backfire at Uni France
 Review of film at New York Times

1964 films
1964 crime films
French crime films
Films directed by Jean Becker
Films set in West Germany
Films set in Greece
Films set in Italy
Films set in Lebanon
Films set in Spain
Films shot in Almería
1960s French-language films
1960s French films